Valaris (died 542) was a Gothic soldier who fought for the Ostrogoths against the Eastern Roman Empire in the Gothic War.

Valaris was part of Totila's army engaged at the Battle of Faventia. Before the battle, Valaris approached the Romans on his horse and challenged any of them to do single combat with him. Procopius (Gothic War, III.4.21–29) describes Valaris as a man of great physical size and martial skill. His martial appearance terrified the Roman soldiers, and only a Persarmenian officer named Artabazes stood forth to accept the challenge.

The duel was conducted on horseback, and Artabazes was able to hit Valaris on his right side with his spear, mortally wounding him. Valaris did not fall, however, being buttressed by his spear that was braced against a rock. While Artabazes was pushing his spear into his enemy trying to finish him off, Valaris' spear, standing almost upright, cut Artabazes' neck. Although the wound was not immediately fatal, it caused a great outpour of blood, which could not be halted. Valaris died on the spot, and Artabazes succumbed to the wound three days later. While Artabazes was nurturing his wound in the rear, however, the Battle of Faventia resulted in a great victory for Totila's Ostrogoths.

See also
 Coccas
 Anzalas

References

Sources

External links
 Valaris Issues a Challenge To Personal Combat. Illustration by Angus McBride (1996)


542 deaths
Ostrogothic duellists
Gothic warriors
6th-century Ostrogothic people
Year of birth unknown
People of the Gothic War (535–554)
People killed in action